"Like a Drum" is a song by Australian recording artist Guy Sebastian released digitally in Australia on 25 October 2013. It debuted at number four on the ARIA Singles Chart, Sebastian's twelfth top ten single in Australia, and has been certified 4× platinum. It also reached number 13 and gold certification on the New Zealand Singles Chart and has been certified platinum in Sweden.

Music video
The video begins as Guy Sebastian starts singing the song as a red hooded figure on a porch of a house. The scene switches to a boy (possibly him as a child) who has a girlfriend though they are possibly ten or twelve years old. As the song goes of scenes of Guy continuing on that porch the childhood girlfriend moves away and the young Guy hops on a bike and scooter and travels the world searching for her. They finally find each other and the swing and play together being happy and the video ends with the adult Guy pulling up his hood and walking off.

Release and promotion
"Like a Drum" was serviced to Australian radio on 21 October 2013. The song became the most played song in Australia in late December where it remained for two weeks. Sebastian performed the song on the Grand Final of season five of The X Factor Australia. Sebastian also performed the song on the Grand Finale of season 13 of Dancing with the Stars Australia and Indonesia's Got Talent (Series 2).

Commercial performance
"Like a Drum" debuted at number four on the ARIA Singles Chart, Sebastian's 12th top ten single in Australia, and tenth to peak in the top five. The song spent 18 weeks in the chart, including ten non-consecutive weeks in the top ten, and has been certified 4× platinum. "Like a Drum" reached number 13 and gold certification in New Zealand, his tenth chart entry there, and eighth to chart in the top 20. It also charted in the top 50 in Sweden and achieved platinum certification.

Track listing
Digital download
"Like a Drum" – 3:01

The Chainsmokers Remix
"Like a Drum" (The Chainsmokers Remix) – 3:20

Charts

Weekly charts

Year-end charts

Certifications

Release history

References

2013 singles
Guy Sebastian songs
Sony Music Australia singles
2013 songs
Songs written by Guy Sebastian